Barrick Gaming Corporation is a private company that was founded by D.W. Barrick and Stephen Crystal.  The company formerly operated several hotels and casinos in Las Vegas, Nevada.  The company is currently based in Las Vegas.

History
In 1993, Barrick formed a joint venture with Station Casinos to develop a riverboat casino in Kansas City.

On March 25, 2004, Barrick Gaming purchased, and began operating, several properties from Jackie Gaughan, a long time Las Vegas casino owner, for $82 million.  The casinos included:
The Gold Spike
The Plaza
The Vegas Club
The Western

Jackie Gaughan, a native of Omaha, Nebraska and a casino operator from the beginning of the post-World War II era,  retained ownership of the El Cortez Hotel & Casino. In the deal, Barrick had the option to purchase the property on right of first refusal.  While it was not announced at the time, Barrick shared ownership of the buildings with Tamares Real Estate Investments which also owns the land under these properties.

In October, 2004, Barrick acquired the Queen of Hearts Hotel & Casino and the Nevada Hotel & Casino.

On November 10, 2004, Barrick announced that it would acquire the Golden Nugget Laughlin for $31 million plus working capital. As part of the purchase agreement, Poster Financial Group granted Barrick a two-year limited use of the Golden Nugget brand name, after which Barrick will be required to change the name of the property.

However, on May 31, 2005, the agreement for Barrick Gaming to acquire the Golden Nugget Laughlin expired without a final deal being reached.  As a result, Landry's Restaurants, Inc. would acquire the property as part of its agreement to purchase the Golden Nugget Las Vegas.

In a further development, on June 28, 2005, Barrick announced that it would sell its interest in the first 4 properties it acquired to the privately owned Tamares.  In addition, it was also selling its interest in about 40 other properties in Las Vegas.

Properties  
The Gold Spike
The Plaza
The Vegas Club
The Western

References

Gambling companies of the United States
Companies based in Las Vegas